Sorsa's fourth cabinet was the 63rd government of Finland, which existed for 1 456 days, from 6 May 1983 to 30 April 1987. The government’s Prime Minister was Kalevi Sorsa. It was a majority government based on the ”red-soil government” model (Finnish: punamultahallitus), as it was a coalition formed by the Social Democrats, the Centre Party, the Swedish People’s Party, and the Rural Party.

Ministers

References

Sorsa
1983 establishments in Finland
1987 disestablishments in Finland
Cabinets established in 1983
Cabinets disestablished in 1987